The AFL South Coast is an Australian rules football competition in the Shoalhaven and Illawarra regions of New South Wales. The AFLSC has three divisions of senior men's football and two divisions of senior women's football. In 2012 The South Coast AFL became "AFL South Coast" incorporating the three leagues of South Coast AFL Seniors, Shoalhaven Juniors and Illawarra Juniors.

History

The South Coast AFL was formed in 1969, composed of players from the military bases of HMAS Albatross, HMAS Creswell, and the cities of Nowra and Wollongong. In 1970 the Bomaderry club was formed and in 1972 Dapto joined the competition.

In 1975, Wollongong and Dapto left the league to create the Illawarra Australian Football League. They were joined by Bulli-Woonona (now known as Northern Districts), Port Kembla and Shellharbour, three clubs who had run junior programs but were introducing senior football.  The sixth foundation club of the senior league was the University of Wollongong.

In 1988, the Wollongong Lions moving to the Sydney Football League causing the league to disband and the remaining clubs joining the South Coast AFL, which was renamed the Leisure Coast Australian Football League. The league returned to the name "South Coast AFL" in 2002.

In 2012 The South Coast AFL became "AFL South Coast" incorporating the three leagues of South Coast AFL Seniors, Shoalhaven Juniors and Illawarra Juniors.

Current

Clubs with Juniors only

 Batemans Bay
 Bay & Basin Bombers
 Bowral Southern Highland Hawks

Previous

Goulburn Hawks 1998
Goulburn/Bargo Knight Hawks 1997

Premierships

	1969	Wollongong
	1970	Wollongong
	1971	Albatross
	1972	Albatross
	1973	Nowra
	1974	Nowra
	1975	Albatross
	1976	Nowra
	1977	Nowra
	1978	Albatross
	1979	Albatross
	1980	Nowra
	1981	East Nowra
	1982	Nowra
	1983	Albatross
	1984	Albatross
	1985	Batemans Bay
	1986	Batemans Bay
	1987	Batemans Bay

	1988	Batemans Bay
	1989	Bomaderry
	1990	Albatross
	1991	Albatross
	1992	Albatross
	1993	Port Kembla
	1994	Bomaderry
	1995	Albatross
	1996	Albatross
	1997	Albatross
	1998	Nowra
	1999	Port Kembla
	2000	Bomaderry
	2001	Nowra
	2002	Nowra
	2003	Camben
	2004	Bomaderry
	2005	Camben

	2006	Bomaderry
	2007	Bomaderry
	2008	Bomaderry
	2009	Kiama
	2010	Bomaderry
	2011	Kiama
	2012	Wollongong University
	2013	Wollongong University
	2014	Wollongong University
Premier Division
   2015    Wollongong Bulldogs
	2016	Wollongong Lions
	2017	Wollongong Lions
	2018	Kiama
	2019	Wollongong Lions
	2020	Figtree
	2022	Figtree

First Division
 2015 Figtree
 2016 Wollongong Bulldogs
 2017 Kiama
 2018 Bomaderry
 2019 Wollongong Bulldogs
 2020  Figtree
 2022 Wollongong Bulldogs
 Second Division
 2018 Bomaderry
 2019 Ulladulla
 2020 Figtree
 2022 Wollongong Bulldogs
Womens Premier
 2018 Bomaderry
 2019 Wollongong Bulldogs
 2020 Wollongong Saints
 2022 Wollongong Lions
Womens Division One
 2019 Ulladulla
 2020 Shellharbour
 2022 Northern Districts Tigers

Honours

Life Members
 Ray Tunbridge, 1975
 Alan Blacker, 1977
 Tom Smith, 1979
 John Collier, 1980
 Stewart Stephens, 1981
 Ian Biggs, 1983
 Eddie Smith, 1985
 Greg Perry, 1987
 John Ford, 1996
 D. Cornish, 1997
 K. Blundell, Reg Douglas and N. Hickmott, 1998
 K. Bright, L. Bright and J. Tatnell, 2005
 Terry Ashton, 2011
 Max Avery, 2009

Tom Smith Memorial Trophy
A lightning premiership played at the start of the season.

 1977 Bomaderry
 1978 Albatross
 1979 Nowra
 1980 East Nowra
 1981 Nowra
 1982 Nowra
 1984 Albatross
 1990 Bomaderry

 1991 Bomaderry
 1992 Albatross
 1993 Port Kembla
 1994 Bomaderry
 1995 Nowra
 1996 Bomaderry
 1997 Bomaderry
 1998 Port Kembla

 1999 Camden
 2001 Albatross
 2002 Bomaderry
 2003 Camden
 2004 Albatross
 2005 Albatross
 2006 Camden
 2007 Nowra

 2008 Bomaderry
 2009 Kiama
 2010 Northern Districts
 2011 Wollongong University
 2012 Kiama
 2013 Kiama
 2017 Figtree

Hall of Fame 

 2017 Neville Hickmott
 2018 Ray Tunbridge
 2019 Tom Smith

AFL players

Arthur Chilcott had a short career with the Sydney Swans between 1984 and 1985. He played 13 games and scored 14 goals. 
Aidan Riley was rookie listed by the Adelaide Crows via the NSW scholarship program, making his debut in 2011 in their round 19 match against Port Adelaide. In 2014 he joined the Melbourne Football Club and after playing the 2014 and 2015 seasons returned to Adelaide to play with the Sturt Football Club in the SANFL. Aidan Riley retired from Sturt in 2019.
James Bell played his debut game for the Sydney Swans in 2019 against Port Adelaide. A former Shellharbour Junior, James signed with the Swans as a Rookie in 2017.

See also

Sapphire Coast Australian Football League
Football South Coast
South Coast Open

References

External links

Australian rules football competitions in New South Wales
South Coast (New South Wales)